Surtur  or Saturn XLVIII (provisional designation S/2006 S 7) is a natural satellite of Saturn. Its discovery was announced by Scott S. Sheppard, David C. Jewitt, Jan Kleyna, and Brian G. Marsden on June 26, 2006 from observations taken between January and April 2006. It was named after Surt, a leader of the fire giants of Norse mythology.

Surtur is about 6 kilometres in diameter, and orbits Saturn at an average distance of 22.707 Mm in 1297.7 days. The Surtian orbit is retrograde, at an inclination of 177.5° to the ecliptic and with an eccentricity of 0.451.

References

 Institute for Astronomy Saturn Satellite Data
 IAUC 8727: Satellites of Saturn June 30, 2006 (discovery)
 MPEC 2006-M45: Eight New Satellites of Saturn June 26, 2006 (discovery and ephemeris)
 IAUC 8826: Satellites of Jupiter and SaturnApril 5, 2007 (naming the moon) 

Norse group
Moons of Saturn
Irregular satellites
Discoveries by Scott S. Sheppard
Astronomical objects discovered in 2006
Moons with a retrograde orbit